John Nott (born 1932) is a British former Conservative politician.

John Nott may also refer to:

 John Nott, chef to the Duke of Bolton, author of The Cooks and Confectioners Dictionary (1723)
 John Nott (physician) (1751–1825), English physician and classical scholar
 John Nott, 14th-century Lord Mayor of London

See also
John A. Notte Jr. (1909–1983), governor of Rhode Island
John Knott (disambiguation)